Evergreen Catholic Separate School Division or Evergreen Catholic Schools is a separate school authority within the Canadian province of Alberta operated out of Spruce Grove.

Schools
Spruce Grove
St. Joseph Catholic School Pre-Kindergarten to Grade 4,
St. Marguerite Catholic School Kindergarten to Grade 4,
St. Peter the Apostle Catholic High School Grades 9-12,
St. Teresa Catholic Learning Centre Grades 7-12,
St. Thomas the Aquinas Catholic School Grades 5-8
Stony Plain
St. John Paul II Catholic School Kindergarten to Grade 8
Westlock
St. Mary School Pre-Kindergarten to Grade 12
Hinton
St. Gregory Catholic School Pre-Kindergarten to Grade 4,
Father Gerard Redmond Community Catholic School Grades 5 to 12
Devon
Holy Spirit Catholic School Pre-Kindergarten to Grade 8

See also 
List of school authorities in Alberta

References

External links 

School districts in Alberta
Spruce Grove